The following are the records of the Marshall Islands in Olympic weightlifting. Records are maintained in each weight class for the snatch lift, clean and jerk lift, and the total for both lifts by the Marshall Islands Weightlifting Federation (AWF).

Current records

Men

Women

Historical records

Men (1998–2018)

Women (1998–2018)

References

External links
 Marshall Islands Weightlifting Federation official website

Marshall Islands
Weightlifting
Records
Olympic weightlifting